In Māori tradition, Nuku-tai-memeha was one of the great ocean-going, voyaging canoes that was used in the migrations that settled New Zealand.

References

See also
List of Māori waka

Māori waka
Māori mythology